Clapham Common was a railway station in Clapham. Renamed in 1846 it closed on 2 March 1863 when  was opened in its place.

The station was close to the West End of London and Crystal Palace Railway's New Wandsworth station located on a separate line, with both stations being open between 1858 and 1863 before being replaced by a combined station at Clapham Junction.

References

   

  

Disused railway stations in the London Borough of Wandsworth
Former London and South Western Railway stations
Railway stations in Great Britain opened in 1838
Railway stations in Great Britain closed in 1863